WMUN-LP was a low-power television station licensed to Muncie, Indiana. It was a repeater that broadcast programming from the Trinity Broadcasting Network, via satellite.

On August 12, 1980, the station signed on as W32AC, and was one of the first low-power TBN repeaters. The station later changed their callsign to WMUN-LP in 1995. WMUN-LP is owned by Full Gospel Business Men's Fellowship, International, who also owned another TBN affiliate, W57AO in Robinson, Illinois. That station went off the air on December 1, 2005.

The station ceased operations sometime during the week of July 18, 2010, according to an article in The Star Press. The station's license was cancelled by the Federal Communications Commission on October 25, 2011, and its call sign deleted from the FCC's database, due to the station having been silent for more than twelve months since October 1, 2010.

External links

Local TV station WMUN ending operations

Trinity Broadcasting Network affiliates
Muncie, Indiana
Television stations in Indiana
Television channels and stations established in 1980
Defunct television stations in the United States
Television channels and stations disestablished in 2010
1980 establishments in Indiana
2010 disestablishments in Indiana
MUN-LP